The 2019 Columbus Challenger III was a professional tennis tournament played on hard courts. It was the eighth edition of the tournament which was part of the 2019 ATP Challenger Tour. It took place in Columbus, United States between 16 and 22 September 2019.

Singles main draw entrants

Seeds

 1 Rankings are as of September 9, 2019.

Other entrants
The following players received entry into the singles main draw as wildcards:
  Justin Boulais
  Robert Cash
  Cannon Kingsley
  Kyle Seelig
  James Trotter

The following player received entry into the singles main draw as an alternate:
  Benjamin Sigouin

The following players received entry from the qualifying draw:
  Ezekiel Clark
  Jacob Dunbar

Champions

Singles

 Peter Polansky def.  J. J. Wolf 6–3, 7–6(7–4).

Doubles

 Martin Redlicki /  Jackson Withrow def.  Nathan Pasha /  Max Schnur 6–4, 7–6(7–4).

References

External links
 Official website

Columbus Challenger III
2019 in American tennis
September 2019 sports events in the United States